The Nissan 370Z (known as the Fairlady Z Z34 in Japan) is a 2-door, 2-seater sports car (S-segment in Europe) manufactured by Nissan Motor Company. It was announced on October 29, 2006, and was first shown at an event in Los Angeles ahead of the 2008 Greater LA Auto Show, before being officially unveiled at the show itself. The 370Z is the sixth generation of the Nissan Z-car line, succeeding the 350Z.
The 370Z marks the last production car with a naturally aspirated and high-rev V6 coupled to a manual transmission.  The 2020 model year was the final model year for the 370Z. The line was continued by the Nissan Z (RZ34) on a modified version of the same platform.

Initial release

Engineering

Almost every piece and component of the 370Z has been redesigned from the previous 350Z. The smaller exterior dimensions and use of more lightweight materials helped reduce weight.

The 370Z features a front aluminum subframe, aluminum-alloy engine cradle, aluminum door panels, an all-aluminum hood, and an aluminum hatch. Front body torsional rigidity is improved by 10 percent with an extensively revised body structure, which includes a new front suspension cradle to reduce front body lateral bending, new rear structural reinforcements, and an underbody "V-bar" to help reduce rear lateral bending. Rear body torsional rigidity is improved by up to 22 percent and rear body vertical bending rigidity is improved by up to 30 percent. Additional enhancements include the use of a carbon fiber composite radiator housing and strengthening of the rear fender and hatch areas. The new structure weighs slightly less than the 350Z.

The 370Z uses a front double wishbone suspension, with forged aluminum control arms and steering knuckle. The rear multi-link suspension uses a forged aluminum upper control arm, lower arm and radius rod, the toe control rod is steel and wheel carrier assembly is aluminum. The refreshed 2013 model uses new dampers with the Sport package models. The brakes have been changed from the more expensive Brembo racing brakes to Nissan branded brakes which are manufactured by Akebono.

The coefficient of drag is 0.30 and 0.29 with the Sport Package, figures identical to the 350Z.

Fairlady Z Coupe (2008–2013)
The Japanese model of the 370Z Coupe went on sale in December 1, 2008.

370Z Coupe (2009–2013)

The vehicle was unveiled in the 2008 Los Angeles Auto Show, with sales of the North American model beginning at Nissan dealers in early 2009.

Standard and optional equipment includes 19-inch RAYS wheels, Bluetooth, Sirius/XM satellite radio, heated electric seats, viscous limited slip differential, Bose sound system with dual subwoofers and 6-CD changer, and automatic climate control.

Deliveries of the European model began in April 2009.

370Z Roadster (2009–2013)

The touring model adds heated and cooling leather-appointed power net seats, a 6-CD Bose audio system with 8 speakers (with dual subwoofer) and MP3/WMA playback, XM Satellite Radio, Bluetooth Hands-free Phone System, HomeLink Universal Transceiver, and aluminium-trimmed pedals.

Touring model also includes following options:
Sport Package: adds 19-inch RAYS forged wheels with Bridgestone Potenza tires, Nissan Akebono Sport Brakes, SynchroRev Match (6-speed manual transmission only), and a Viscous Limited Slip Differential.
Navigation Package: adds touch-screen Nissan Hard Drive Navigation System with XM NavTraffic real-time traffic information, a 9.3GB Music Box hard drive for digital music storage and playback, and a USB port for iPod connectivity.

370Z Roadster went on sale in late summer 2009 as 2010 model year vehicle. Early models include the 370Z and 370Z Touring, with Sport Package and Navigation packages for the 370Z Touring.

European models went on sale as 2010 model year vehicles.

The Roadster was discontinued in the US market after the 2019 model year. In Canada, however, it continued to be sold up to its 2020 model year.

NISMO 370Z (2009–2013)

The NISMO version was introduced for the 2009 model year. Transmission choice is limited to a 6-speed manual with Nissan's new "SynchroRev Match" function. Handling is improved via stiffened springs and stabilizer bars compared to the 370Z Coupe. Other equipment includes 19-inch RAYS forged aluminium-alloy wheels with Yokohama ADVAN Sport Y-rated tires (P245/40ZR19 front, P285/35ZR19 rear), 14.0-inch front and 13.8-inch rear vented rotors, NISMO Sport Brakes with 4-piston front and 2-piston rear aluminium calipers, and a fully integrated chin spoiler.

The vehicle went on sale in June 2009.

US model went on sale on June 17, 2009 with an MSRP of US$39,130.

The vehicle was unveiled at the 2009 New York Auto Show.

2015 updates

For 2015, the Nissan 370Z NISMO has seen various updates: an automatic (seven-speed) transmission, a built-in navigation system, and tweaks to its restyled front and rear fascia and body trim.

Fairlady Z Roadster, Fairlady Z 40th Anniversary (2009–2013)

Sales of the Japanese model of the 370Z Roadster began on October 15, 2009.

The Fairlady Z 40th Anniversary is a limited version of the Fairlady Z coupe Version ST for the Japanese market. It was built to commemorate the 40th anniversary of the original Fairlady Z. It includes:

A choice of a 6-speed manual or 7-speed automatic transmission
Real Leather/Suede-like Fabric Combination Seat specifically made for the 40th Anniversary model & Door trim (color: red)
Memorial engraving on the seat back. ("40th Anniversary")
Real leather-covered steering (with red stitches)
Real leather-covered shift knob
Console boot (with red stitches)
Instrument panel upper box (with red stitches)
Kneepads in the driver and passenger seats (with red stitches)
Special emblem (in the rear) for the 40th Anniversary model
RAYS special aluminium forging wheels for the 40th Anniversary model (dark chrome color coating)
Special SPORT Brake Calipers for the 40th Anniversary model. (color: red)
body colour: Metal Gray (Multi flex color) (Special color for the 40th Anniversary model), Premium Deep Maroon (P), Brilliant White Pearl (3P), Brade Silver (M), Diamond Black (P), Vibrant Red (C)

370Z Yellow (2009)

The 370Z Yellow is a limited edition of the 370Z GT Pack coupe for the British market, inspired by the European GT4 race car. It includes an Ultimate Yellow body colour, 19-inch RAYS forged alloy wheels, black leather and suede interior upholstery, integrated satellite navigation system, illuminated entry plates, special mats and a Bose audio with 8 speakers and a 6-CD autochanger.

The vehicle went on sale in September 2009 for £31,650 (manual) or £33,050 (automatic).

A North American version, was also available with a different paint color called Chicane Yellow for 2009 only, is otherwise identical to 370Zs. Chicane Yellow was also available the following  model year for an extra $500 in North America as the only extra cost color with other colors available for no additional charge.

370Z Nürburgring Edition (2009)
The 370Z Nürburgring Edition is a limited (80 units) version of the 370Z coupe for the German market. It includes a Premium Ultimate Yellow body colour, special decals, a more sonorous Cobra exhaust system, a numbered plaque, 19-inch OZ alloy wheels, Dunlop SP Sport Maxx GT tires (255/40 R19 front, 285/35 R19 back) and a €150 gift card redeemable at the Nürburgring.

370Z 40th Anniversary Edition (2010)
The 370Z 40th Anniversary Edition is a limited (1,000 units) version based on the 370Z Coupe Touring, built to commemorate the 40th anniversary of the Datsun 240Z arriving in North America. It includes a manual transmission, Sport Package (including SynchroRev Match, front chin spoiler, rear spoiler, Nissan Sport Brakes, 19-inch RAYS forged aluminium-alloy wheels and viscous limited-slip differential), special "40th Anniversary Graphite" exterior color, red leather interior upholstery, a high-luster smoke wheel finish, red brake calipers, 40th Anniversary badges on the rear hatch and front strut tower brace, red door panel inserts, 40th Anniversary seatback and floormat embroidery, and red stitching on the center stack, shift boot and kneepads. It also has a leather steering wheel with red stitching, a plaque of authenticity, and a commemorative premium satin car cover.

The vehicle was unveiled at the 2010 Chicago Auto Show.

The vehicle went on sale in spring 2010.

370Z Black Edition (2010–2011)
The 370Z Black Edition is a limited (370 units) version of the 370Z Coupe commemorating the 40th Anniversary of the Datsun 240Z launch in the US market. It was built for the European market. It includes unique red leather & suede appointed interior (seats & door trim) with embossed 40th Anniversary logo seats, smooth leather wrapped steering wheel with red stitching, red stitching on the centre cluster, centre console and knee pads; Nissan's Connect Premium combined touch-screen satellite navigation and audio system with USB connectivity, dark grey 19" aluminium forged RAYS wheels, red brake calipers, 40th Anniversary emblem on the back door.

The vehicle went on sale from all Nissan High Performance Centres and throughout the dealer network with deliveries starting in April.

BRE 370Z (2010)
The BRE 370Z is a version of the 2010 Nissan NISMO 370Z Coupe built to commemorate the 40th Anniversary of the Z's First National Championship. the 370Z commemorative car was built by STILLEN and it includes a red, white and blue BRE paint scheme designed by Pete Brock.

The vehicle was unveiled at the BRE Reunion dinner at the Classic Motorsports Mitty at Road Atlanta on Thursday, April 29, 2010.

Fairlady Z version NISMO (2011–2013)
The vehicle was unveiled at the 2011 Tokyo Auto Salon, and later at the 2012 Tokyo Auto Salon.

2011 Model Year Nissan 370Z Coupe and Roadster (2011–2013)
Changes to the 370Z Coupe and Roadster for the 2011 model year include:
a new tire pressure monitoring system
a rear view camera integrated into the Nissan Premium Connect satellite navigation system
improved isolation of road noise on the Coupé
automatic versions of both Coupé and Roadster have a revised 'Snow' setting for enhanced grip when setting off on ice and snow
GT Pack versions add heated and ventilated leather/suede seats, a premium BOSE sound system, cruise control, 19-inch forged alloy wheels, Synchro Rev Control technology on the manual version along with Uphill Start Support

European models went on sale as 2011 model year vehicles.

370Z GT Edition (2011–2012)
The 370Z GT Edition is a version of the 370Z Coupé commemorating Nissan's global success in GT racing and 40 years of the Z in the UK. It is built for the UK market and it includes a choice of 3 body colours, (Pearl White, Kuro (metallic) black and Black Rose), grey 'GT' stripes running along the flanks of the car, 19 inch RAYS forged alloy wheels in dark anthracite colour, retuned dampers to provide the ideal balance between ride comfort and high-speed handling, a rear view parking camera as part of the Premium Connect satellite navigation system, a tyre pressure monitoring system, seven-speed automatic option with snow mode and revised underbody insulation to reduce road noise.

The vehicle went on sale starting at £35,000, and deliveries began on 1 June 2011.

Body styles

Engines

Transmissions
All models (including the 2015 Nismo) include either a 7-speed automatic transmission with paddle shifters or a 6-speed manual transmission. SynchroRev Match system for 6-speed manual transmission is included with the Sport Package.

Performance
The  acceleration times are:
 coupe (6-speed manual transmission): 4.7 seconds
 coupe (7-speed automatic with paddle shifters): 4.6 seconds
 roadster: mid-5s seconds

 times from a standing start are:
 coupe: 13.3 seconds at 
 roadster: mid-14s seconds at 

Lateral skidpad acceleration is:
 coupe: 0.99 g
 roadster: 1.00 g

Braking:
 (roadster):

Physical

Trim levels
US trims: 370Z (base), Sport, Touring, Sport Touring, NISMO
Japan trims: Fairlady Z (base), Fairlady Z Version S, Fairlady Z Version T, Fairlady Z Version ST, Fairlady Z Version NISMO

Sales

Awards and recognition
JD Power and Associates Highest Ranked Compact Premium Sporty Car in Initial Quality 2009
Kelley Blue Book's Best Resale Value Award (2010)
Consumers Digest Automotive Best Buy Award
Best of What’s New by Popular Science

Marketing
The Nissan 370Z is featured in Electronic Arts' Need for Speed: Undercover video game which was released on November 18, 2008. This allowed people to drive the 370Z in-game prior to the vehicle's actual release. Nissan claimed it to be the first time an automaker had a vehicle world premiere by partnering with a video game company. It was featured in the Xbox 360 racing simulator Forza Motorsport 3, and featured in the PlayStation 3 driving simulator game Gran Turismo 5, it was also featured in Need for Speed: Hot Pursuit. The 370Z also made its debut on the arcade racing game Wangan Midnight Maximum Tune 3DX. The car also appeared in the Asphalt franchise, and Real Racing 3.

A version of Megatron Fairlady Z was produced by Takara TOMY, as part of the Transformers Alternity toy line.

As part of the UK market launch, a TV commercial featuring a Nissan 370Z vs racing chickens was produced.

As part of Nissan's plan to build the ultimate 370Z track car, a campaign allowing fans to vote which components will be used in the project took place in association with Facebook and Autoblog. The suspension choices (hosted by Autoblog) include NISMO S-Tune Springs and Dampers, KW Variant 3s and an A'PEXi S1 Damper System. The completed vehicle includes a GReddy twin turbo kit, GReddy Ti-C catback exhaust system, KW Variant 3 suspension, Stoptech big brake kit with 2 piece aerorotors, Volk TE37SL wheels and a Metalloy decal kit.

Motorsport
The Nissan 370Z has enjoyed some successes in motorsport. Notably, in drifting Chris Forsberg campaigned a twin turbo, 812 horsepower, 676 lb-ft torque VQ37DE 370Z in the 2017 Formula DRIFT season. After an engine failure in the debut round, he piloted his backup 370Z. This car was powered by a 5.6L V8 swapped from a Nissan Titan and produced over 1,000 horsepower.

2013 model year update (2012–2020)

370Z (2012–2020)

New features for the 2013 model year include:
Refreshed front fascia with vertical LED daytime running lights (except NISMO 370Z)
A new 18-inch wheel design for 370Z Coupe
Two new body colours – Magma Red and Midnight Blue
The Sport Package equipped models include a new larger 19-inch wheel design, with larger red-color brake calipers and Euro-tuned shock absorbers.
The Sport Tech Package equipped models include the Sport Package features, plus a touch-screen audio and navigation screen.
The NISMO 370Z includes 5-spoke 19-inch RAYS forged aluminium-alloy wheels with a dark-finish, revised brake system components, optional Bose Premium Audio Package (six speakers, in-dash 6CD changer, Bluetooth Hands-Free Phone System, auto-dimming inside mirror, and HomeLink Universal Transceiver), and Magma Red body colour option.

The 370Z coupe was unveiled at the 2012 Chicago Auto Show.

The 370Z coupe and 370Z roadster were unveiled at the 2012 Paris Motor Show.

Sale of the vehicle began in June 2012.

Fairlady Z Coupe, Roadster, Fairlady Z Version NISMO (2012–2020)
Changes to the Fairlady Z Coupe and Roadster include:
new front bumper with LED hyper daylight
Dark chrome colour 19-inch aluminium wheel standard in Coupe Version ST and Version S, optional in Roadster Version ST
18-inch aluminium wheel from Fairlady Z Roadster for Coupe (except Version ST and Version S)
Red brake calipers as standard on Coupe Version S and Version ST, Roadster Version ST
2 new body colours premium sun flare orange and dark blue for total of 8 colours
Base colour for car information display is changed to dark metallic grey
Front and rear shock absorbers are tuned to improve stability (Coupe Version S and Version ST, Roadster Version ST)
Brake pads use new friction material to improve stability when braking from high speed to low-medium speed, and improved fade endurance (Coupe Version S and Version ST, Roadster Version ST)
Changes to Fairlady Z Version NISMO include:
Bridgestone Potenza RE-11 tires
Increased body rigidity
Suspension tuning

The Fairlady Z Version NISMO was unveiled at the 2012 Tokyo Auto Salon.

The vehicles went on sale on July 18, 2012.

Fairlady Z NISMO Z-Challenge Spec (2013)
It is a race car based on the Fairlady Z for the Z-Challenge single-spec race series.

The vehicle was unveiled at the 2013 Tokyo Auto Salon.

370Z NISMO (2014–2020)
The 2014 370Z NISMO is an updated version of the NISMO 370Z with:
new dark gray coloring added to the front and rear fascias, lower side sills, side mirrors and NISMO rear spoiler, with each element (except side sills) featuring NISMO-style red pinstripe accents
Solid Red replaces the previous Magma Red body colour option
addition of a new steering wheel with Alcantara appointments and red accents
addition of red NISMO tachometer
Bridgestone POTENZA S001 tyres (245/40ZR19 front, 285/35ZR19 rear)

The vehicle was unveiled at the 2013 Chicago Auto Show, followed by the 2013 Geneva Motor Show.

The US model was set to go on sale in summer 2013.

Fairlady Z NISMO (2013–2020)
The Fairlady Z NISMO is an updated version of the Fairlady Z Version NISMO with:

Special front bumper (Front LED hyper daytime running lights are not installed)
Special door 
Special side sill protectors
Special rear bumper and rear fog lamps
Special rear spoiler
Special fender molding (front and rear)
NISMO badges (front and rear)
Four available exterior colors: Brilliant White Pearl, Brilliant Silver, Diamond Black and Vibrant Red
Special combination seats made with genuine leather and suede-like fabric (with ‘nismo' logo and red stitching)
Alcantara-covered steering wheel with three spokes (featuring a red center mark and red stitching)
Special genuine leather shift knob (smooth leather)
Special console boot (with red stitching)
Special door trim (with red stitching)
Special serial number plate
Special instrument cluster (with ‘nismo' logo, red tachometer dial and 280-km/h speedometer)
Special instrument upper box (with red stitching)
Special knee cushion pads for the driver and passenger (with red stitching)
Special engine cover
Customized suspension system (springs, shock absorbers and stabilizer bars)
Special highly rigid compression rod bushings
RAYS special forged aluminium-alloy wheels (with ‘Nismo' logo, dark metallic coating)
Special Bridgestone Potenza RE-11 tires (front: 245/40R19, rear: 285/35R19)
Special high-rigid brake hose
High-performance brake fluid
Four-wheel aluminium-caliper opposed-piston brakes
Special vehicle speed-sensing power steering system
Special strut tower bar (with ‘nismo' logo)
Special front member brace
Special under-luggage brace
Special rear under-floor V-bar
Special Yamaha performance dampers (front and rear)
The vehicle went on sale on June 24, 2013.

Engines

Transmissions

The 7-speed automatic transmission includes a manual shift mode, paddle shifters and Downshift Rev Matching. The 6-speed manual transmission includes SynchroRev Match synchronized Downshift Rev Matching system.

Equipment
US trims: 370Z (base), Touring, Sport, Sport Tech, NISMO, NISMO Tech (2017–2018 only)
Japan trims: Fairlady Z (base (coupe, roadster 6MT)), Fairlady Z Version S (coupe 6MT), Fairlady Z Version ST, Fairlady Z Version T (7AT), Fairlady Z Version NISMO, Fairlady Z NISMO

Marketing
As part of the Nissan 370Z campaign, a series of 6 Heisman House TV commercials were produced, featuring previous Heisman Trophy winners. Nissan 370Z Roadster was featured in the 'Hula' commercial. The car has featured in Rio 2, Dawn of the Planet of the Apes, Sleepless and other films. The Nismo 370Z had also made its Driveclub debut alongside its other Nissan sports car, the GT-R as one of the 5 DLC cars in the RPM Expansion Pack and it is also the first Japanese carmaker to appear in the game.

See also
 List of Nissan vehicles

References

External links

 
 (U.S)

370Z
Rear-wheel-drive vehicles
Sports cars
Coupés
Roadsters
Touring cars
Police vehicles
2010s cars
Cars introduced in 2009